Edia semiluna is a moth in the family Crambidae. It was described by Smith in 1905. It is found in southern Arizona and Mexico.

The length of the forewings is 8–10 mm. The ground colour of the forewings is white with a faint olivaceous tinge. The basal area is olivaceous brown from the costa to the inner margin. The hindwings are white, with a smoky margin. Adults have been recorded on wing in May, August and October.

References

Moths described in 1905
Odontiini